Behind the lacrimal process of the inferior nasal conchae lies a broad, thin plate, the ethmoidal process, which ascends to join the uncinate process of the ethmoid; from its lower border a thin lamina, the maxillary process, curves downward and lateralward; it articulates with the maxilla and forms a part of the medial wall of the maxillary sinus.

References 

Bones of the head and neck